French School in Tashkent is a French international school in Mirzo-Ulugbek, Tashkent, Uzbekistan, serving preschool through grade 12. French parents opened the school in 1997. The AEFE accredited the primary school in 2001.

Students taking the Diplôme National du Brevet examination do so in Tashkent. Students taking the baccalauréat travel to the Lycée Français Alexandre Dumas de Moscou in Moscow for their exams.

References

External links

 French School in Tashkent
 

Tashkent
International schools in Uzbekistan
1997 establishments in Uzbekistan
Educational institutions established in 1997
Education in Tashkent